Caught You is the third album by the reggae band Steel Pulse, released in 1980. It was released in the United States as Reggae Fever. Caught You was the band's final album for Island Records.

Critical reception
AllMusic wrote that "while there were still heavy messages to be found in songs like 'Harassment' and 'Nyahbinghi Voyage', the band's jazzbo tendencies were front and center." Trouser Press called the album "Steel Pulse at its most pop-oriented," but lamented the "increasing tendency towards preachy, trite lyrics."

Track listing
All songs written by David Hinds except as shown.
"Drug Squad"  – 3:53
"Harassment"  – 4:18
"Reggae Fever"  – 3:26
"Shining" (Alphonso Martin) – 3:55
"Heart of Stone (Chant Them)"  – 5:00
"Rumours (Not True)"  – 3:52
"Caught You Dancing"  – 3:25
"Burning Flame"  – 3:09
"Higher Than High" (Basil Gabbidon) – 3:18
"Nyahbinghi Voyage"  – 5:00

Personnel
Steel Pulse
David Hinds - vocals, guitar
Basil Gabbidon - lead guitar
Alphonso Martin, Selwyn Brown - vocals
Ronald "Stepper" McQueen - bass
Steve Nisbett - drums

References

Steel Pulse albums
1980 albums
Mango Records albums
Albums produced by Del Newman